Mara Rosolen (born 27 July 1965 in Motta di Livenza, Treviso) is a retired female shot putter from Italy. She won two medals at the Mediterranean Games. She set her personal best (18.81 metres) on 20 August 2000 in Avezzano.

Achievements

National titles
Rosolen has won thirteen individual titles at the  Italian Athletics Championships.
5 wins in Shot put (1994, 1996, 1997, 1998, 2000)
2 wins in Discus throw (1994, 1999)
6 wins in Shot put (1995, 1996, 1997, 1998, 1999, 2000)

See also
Italian all-time lists - Shot put

References

External links
 

1965 births
Living people
People from Motta di Livenza
Italian female shot putters
Olympic athletes of Italy
Athletes (track and field) at the 2000 Summer Olympics
World Athletics Championships athletes for Italy
Athletics competitors of Fiamme Oro
Mediterranean Games gold medalists for Italy
Mediterranean Games bronze medalists for Italy
Mediterranean Games medalists in athletics
Athletes (track and field) at the 1991 Mediterranean Games
Athletes (track and field) at the 1997 Mediterranean Games
Italian masters athletes
Competitors at the 1991 Summer Universiade
Sportspeople from the Province of Treviso
20th-century Italian women
21st-century Italian women